Route 217 is a provincial highway located in the Montérégie region of Quebec south of Montreal. It runs from Montée Guay in Saint-Bernard-de-Lacolle and ends in La Prairie at the junctions of Route 104 and Autoroute 30. It serves in part as a service route for Autoroute 15 until Saint-Philippe and, where it runs along the Saint-Jacques River, and serves as a service route for Autoroute 30 until La Prairie and its northeastern terminus at Route 104.

Route 217 previously extended south from Montée Guay to the Canada–US border, connecting with Meridian Road at Champlain, New York. However, this port of entry closed around 1950, with the Canada border station later dismantled and the US border station converted into offices for the United States Department of Agriculture. This  segment remained part of Route 217 (and its pre-1970s predecessor, Route 9A) as recent as 2005, but in recent years has been truncated at Montée Guay.

Municipalities along Route 217
 Saint-Bernard-de-Lacolle
 Saint-Cyprien-de-Napierville
 Saint-Jacques-le-Mineur
 Saint-Philippe
 La Prairie

Major intersections

See also
 List of Quebec provincial highways

References

External links 
 Map of Transports Quebec 
 Route 217 on Google Maps

217